Rasool Pur  also known as Akikey Rasool Pur which also spell as a Akki Ki Rasool Pura , is a town and Union Council of Kasur District in the Punjab province of Pakistan.

Reference 

Union councils of Kasur District
Kasur District